John Gordon Harrower FRSE FRCSE (1890–1936) was a Scottish anatomist. He was an expert on the human skull, and classified many separate Asiatic types.

Harrower was born on 4 April 1890 in Glasgow the son of John Harrower in Langside in the south of the city. He won a scholarship to Allan Glen's School and was educated alongside contemporaries such as John Vernon Harrison. Initially training primarily in mathematics and electricity, in 1910 he obtained a senior post at Glasgow Tramways Power Station, which he retained until 1919.

His interested shifted from electricity to radiology, and he retrained as a physician. He attended night school at the Royal Technical College in Glasgow and graduated MB ChB in 1913 and gained his doctorate in 1918. In 1919 he became a Demonstrator (dissecting bodies in front of students during anatomy lectures) at Glasgow University. In 1922 he was given a professorship to teach anatomy at the Singapore Medical College. In 1925 he was granted his DSc from the University of Edinburgh for his thesis A Study of the Hokien and the Tamil Skull, sampled from coolies originated from Tamil and Southern Fujian in Singapore, became a commonly cited source in Chinese literature as the dimensions of the skulls of "modern Southern Chinese". In 1926 he was elected a Fellow of the Royal Society of Edinburgh. His proposers were Thomas Hastie Bryce, Sir John Graham Kerr, Diarmid Noel Paton, and Ralph Stockman.

He died in Singapore on 9 April 1936, a few days after his 46th birthday.

Publications

A Study of the Hokien and the Tamil Skull (1926)
Variations in the Region of the Foramen Magnum (1923)
A Study of the Crania of the Hylam Chinese (1931)

References

1890 births
1936 deaths
Academics from Glasgow
Scottish anatomists
Fellows of the Royal Society of Edinburgh
Academics of the University of Glasgow
People educated at Allan Glen's School
Medical doctors from Glasgow